Marshal of France (plural ) is a French military distinction, rather than a military rank, that is awarded to generals for exceptional achievements. The title has been awarded since 1185, though briefly abolished (1793–1804) and for a period dormant (1870–1916).

A Marshal of France displays seven stars on each shoulder strap. A marshal also receives a baton – a blue cylinder with stars, formerly fleurs-de-lis during the monarchy and eagles during the First French Empire.

The distinction of Admiral of France is the equivalent in the French Navy.

History
The title derived from the office of marescallus Franciae created by King Philip II Augustus of France for Albéric Clément.

The title was abolished by the National Convention in 1793. It was restored as Marshal of the Empire during the First French Empire by Napoleon. Under the Bourbon Restoration, the title reverted to Marshal of France, and Napoleon III kept that designation.

After the fall of Napoleon III and the Second French Empire, the Third Republic did not use the title until the First World War, when it was recreated as a military distinction and not a rank.

Contrarily to ranks, which are awarded by the army, the distinction of Marshal of France is awarded by a special law voted by the French Parliament. For this reason, it is impossible to demote a Marshal. The most famous case is Philippe Pétain, who was awarded the distinction of Marshal of France for his generalship in World War I, and who was stripped of other positions and titles after his trial for high treason due to his involvement with collaborationist Vichy France: due to the principle of separation of powers, the court that judged him did not have the power to cancel the law that had made him a Marshal in the first place.

The last living Marshal of France was Alphonse Juin, promoted in 1952, who died in 1967. The latest Marshal of France was Marie-Pierre Kœnig, who was made a Marshal posthumously in 1984. Today, the title of Marshal of France can only be granted to a general officer who fought victoriously in war-time.

Direct Capetians

Philip II, 1180–1223
 Albéric Clément, Lord of Le Mez (died 1191), Marshal of France in 1185
 Matthew II of Montmorency, Lord of Montmorency and Marly, Marshal of France in 1191
 Guillaume de Bournel, (died 1195), Marshal of France in 1192
 Nivelon d'Arras (died 1204), Marshal of France in 1202
 Henry I Clément, called the "Little Marshal", Lord of Le Mez and of Argentan (1170–1214), Marshal of France in 1204
 Jean III Clément, Lord of Le Mez and of Argentan (died 1262), Marshal of France in 1214
 Guillaume de la Tournelle (dates unknown), Marshal of France in 1220

Louis IX, 1226–1270
 Ferry Pasté, Lord of Challeranges (died 1247), Marshal of France in 1240
 Jean Guillaume de Beaumont (died 1257), Marshal of France in 1250
 Henri de Cousances (died 1268), Marshal of France in 1255
 Gauthier III, Lord of Nemours (died 1270), Marshal of France in 1257
 Henri II Clément, Lord of Le Mez and Argentan (died 1265), Marshal of France in 1262
 Héric de Beaujeu (died 1270), Marshal of France in 1265
 Renaud de Précigny (died 1270), Marshal of France in 1265
 Hugh of Mirepoix, Marshal of France in 1266
 Raoul II Sores (died 1282), Marshal of France in 1270
 Lancelot de Saint-Maard (died 1278), Marshal of France in 1270

Philip III, 1270–1285
 Ferry de Verneuil (died 1283), Marshal of France in 1272
 Guillaume V du Bec Crespin (died 1283), Marshal of France in 1283
 Jean II d'Harcourt, Viscount of Châtellerault, Lord of Harcourt (died 1302), Marshal of France in 1283
 Raoul V Le Flamenc (died 1287), Marshal of France in 1285

Philip IV, 1285–1314
 Jean de Varennes (died 1292), Marshal of France in 1288
 Simon de Melun, Lord of La Loupe and of Marcheville (died 1302), Marshal of France in 1290
 Guy Ier de Clermont de Nesle (died 1302), Marshal of France in 1292
 Foulques du Merle (died 1314), Marshal of France in 1302
 Miles VI de Noyers (died 1350), Marshal of France in 1302
 Jean de Corbeil, Lord of Grez (died 1318), Marshal of France in 1308

Louis X, 1314–1316
 Jean IV de Beaumont (died 1318), Marshal of France in 1315

Philip V, 1316–1322
 Mathieu de Trie (died 1344), Marshal of France in 1318
 Jean des Barres (dates unknown), Marshal of France in 1318
 Bernard VI de Moreuil, Lord of Moreuil (died 1350), Marshal of France in 1322

Charles IV, 1322–1328
 Robert-Jean Bertran de Briquebec, Baron of Briquebec, Viscount of Roncheville (1285–1348), Marshal of France in 1325

Valois

Philip VI, 1328–1350
 Anseau de Joinville (1265–1343), Marshal of France in 1339
 Charles I de Montmorency, Lord of Montmorency (1325–1381), Marshal of France in 1344
 Robert de Waurin, Lord of Saint-Venant (died 1360), Marshal of France in 1344
 Guy II de Nesle, Lord of Offémont and of Mello (died 1352), Marshal of France in 1345
 Édouard I de Beaujeu, Lord of Châteauneuf (1316–1351), Marshal of France in 1347

John II 1350–1364
 Arnoul d'Audrehem, Lord of Audrehem (died 1370), Marshal of France in 1351
 Rogues de Hangest, Lord of Avesnecourt (died 1352), Marshal of France in 1352
 Jean de Clermont, Lord of Chantilly and of Beaumont (died 1356), Marshal of France in 1352
 Jean I Le Maingre (1310–1367), Marshal of France in 1356

Charles V, 1364–1380
 Jean IV de Mauquenchy, Lord of Blainville (died 1391), Marshal of France in 1368
 Louis de Sancerre, Count of Sancerre (1342–1402), Marshal of France in 1369

Charles VI, 1380–1422
 Jean II Le Meingre (1364–1421), Marshal of France in 1391
 Jean II de Rieux, Lord of Rochefort and of Rieux (1342–1417), Marshal of France in 1397
 Pierre de Rieux, Lord of Rochefort and of Rieux (1389–1439), Marshal of France in 1417
Claude de Beauvoir, Lord of Chastellux and Viscount of Avallon (1385–1453), Marshal of France in 1418
 Jean de Villiers de L'Isle-Adam (1384–1437), Marshal of France in 1418
 Jacques de Montberon, Lord of Engoumois (died 1422), Marshal of France in 1418
 Gilbert Motier de La Fayette (1396–1464), Marshal of France in 1421
 Antoine de Vergy (died 1439), Marshal of France in 1422
 Jean de La Baume, Count of Montrevel-en-Bresse (died 1435), Marshal of France in 1422

Charles VII, 1422–1461
 Amaury de Séverac, Lord of Beaucaire and of Chaude-Aigues (died 1427), Marshal of France in 1424
 Jean de Brosse, Baron of Boussac and of Sainte-Sévère (1375–1433), Marshal of France in 1426
 Gilles de Rais, Lord of Ingrande and of Champtocé (1404–1440), Marshal of France in 1429
 André de Laval-Montmorency, Lord of Lohéac and of Retz (1408–1486), Marshal of France in 1439
 Philippe de Culant, Lord of Jaloignes, of La Croisette, of Saint-Armand and of Chalais (died 1454), Marshal of France in 1441
 Jean Poton de Xaintrailles, Seneschal de Limousin (1390–1461), Marshal of France in 1454

Louis XI, 1461–1483
 Joachim Rouhault de Gamaches, Lord of Boismenard (died 1478), Marshal of France in 1461
 Jean de Lescun, Count of Comminges (died 1473), Marshal of France in 1461
 Wolfart VI Van Borselleen, Lord of Veere in Zeeland and Earl of Buchan in Scotland (died 1487), Marshal of France in 1464
 Pierre de Rohan de Gié, Lord of Rohan (1450–1514), Marshal of France in 1476

Charles VIII, 1483–1498
 Philippe de Crèvecœur d'Esquerdes (1418–1494), Marshal of France in 1486
 Jean de Baudricourt, Lord of Choiseul and Bailiff of Chaumont (died 1499), Marshal of France in 1486

Valois-Orléans

Louis XII, 1498–1515
 Gian Giacomo Trivulzio, Marquis of Vigevano (1448–1518), Marshal of France in 1499
 Charles II d'Amboise, Lord of Chaumont, of Meillan and of Charenton (1473–1511), Marshal of France in 1506
 Odet de Foix, Vicomte de Lautrec, Viscount of Lautrec (1485–1528), Marshal of France in 1511
 Robert Stewart, Lord of Aubigny, Count of Lennox (1470–1544), Marshal of France in 1514

Valois-Angoulême

Francis I 1515–1547
 Jacques II de Chabannes, Lord of La Palice (died 1525), Marshal of France in 1515
 Gaspard I de Coligny, Lord of Châtillon-sur-Loing (died 1522), Marshal of France in 1516
 Thomas de Foix-Lescun (died 1525), Marshal of France in 1518
 Anne I de Montmorency, Duke of Montmorency and of Damville, Count of Beaumont-sur-Oise and of Dammartin, Viscount of Melun, first Baron of France and Grand Master, Constable of France etc. (1492–1567), Marshal of France in 1522
 Théodor Trivulce (1458–1531), Marshal of France in 1526
 Robert III de La Marck, Duke of Bouillon, Lord of Sedan (1491–1537), Marshal of France in 1526
 Claude d'Annebaut (1500–1552), Marshal of France in 1538
 René de Montjean (died 1538), Lord of Montjean, Marshal of France in 1538
 Oudard du Biez, Seigneur of Le Biez (died 1553), Marshal of France in 1542
 Antoine de Lettes-Desprez, Lord of Montpezat (1490–1544), Marshal of France in 1544
 Jean Caraccioli, Prince of Melphes (1480–1550), Marshal of France in 1544

Henry II 1547–1559
 Jacques d'Albon de Saint-André, Marquis of Fronsac (died 1562), Marshal of France 1547
 Robert IV de La Marck, Duke of Bouillon and Prince of Sedan (1520–1556), Marshal of France in 1547
 Charles de Cossé, Count of Brissac (1505–1563), Marshal of France in 1550
 Pietro Strozzi (1500–1558), Marshal of France in 1554
 Paul de La Barthe, Lord of Thermes (1482–1562), Marshal of France in 1558

Francis II 1559–1560
 François de Montmorency, Duke of Montmorency (1520–1579), Marshal of France in 1559

Charles IX, 1560–1574
 François de Scépeaux, Lord of Vieilleville (1509–1571), Marshal of France in 1562
 Imbert de La Plâtière, Lord of Bourdillon (1524–1567), Marshal of France in 1562
 Henri I de Montmorency, Lord of Damville, Duke of Montmorency, Count of Dammartin and Alais, Baron of Chateaubriant, Lord of Chantilly and Ecouen (1534–1614), Marshal of France in 1566
 Artus de Cossé-Brissac, Lord of Gonnor and Count of Secondigny (1512-1582), Marshal of France in 1567
 Gaspard de Saulx, Lord of Tavannes (1509–1575), Marshal of France in 1570
 Honorat II de Savoye, Marquis of Villars (1511-1580), Marshal of France in 1571
 Albert de Gondi, Duke of Retz (1522–1602), Marshal of France in 1573

Henry III 1574–1589
 Roger I de Saint Larry, Lord of Bellegarde (died 1579), Marshal of France in 1574
 Blaise de Lasseran-Massencôme, Seigneur de Montluc (1500–1577), Marshal of France in 1574
 Louis Prévost de Sansac, Baron de Sansac (1496–1576), Marshal of France
 Armand de Gontaut, Baron de Biron (1524–1592), Marshal of France in 1577
 Jacques II de Goyon, Lord of Matignon and of Lesparre, Count of Thorigny, Prince of Mortagne sur Gironde (1525–1597), Marshal of France in 1579
 Jean VI d'Aumont, Baron of Estrabonne, Count of Châteauroux (1522-1595), Marshal of France 
 Guillaume de Joyeuse, Viscount of Joyeuse, Lord of Saint-Didier, of Laudun, of Puyvert and of Arques (1520–1592), Marshal of France in 1582

Bourbons

Henry IV 1589–1610
 Henri de La Tour d'Auvergne, Vicomte de Turenne, Duc de Bouillon (1555–1623), Marshal of France in 1592
 Charles de Gontaut, Duc de Biron (1562–1602), Marshal of France in 1594
 Claude de La Châtre (1536–1614), Marshal of France in 1594
 Jean de Montluc de Balagny (1560–1603), Marshal of France in 1594
 Charles II de Cossé, Duke of Brissac (1562–1621), Marshal of France in 1594
 Jean III de Baumanoir, Marquis of Lavardin and Count of Nègrepelisse (1551–1614), Marshal of France in 1595
 Henri, Duke of Joyeuse (1567–1608), Marshal of France in 1595
 Urbain de Montmorency-Laval, Marquis of Sablé (1557–1629), Marshal of France in 1595
 Alphonse d'Ornano (1548–1610), Marshal of France in 1597
 Guillaume de Hautemer, Count of Grancey (1537–1613), Marshal of France in 1597
 François de Bonne, Duke of Lesdiguières (1543–1626), Marshal of France in 1608

Louis XIII, 1610–1643

 Concino Concini, Marquis of Ancre (1575–1617), Marshal of France in 1613
 Gilles de Courtenvaux, Marquis of Souvré (1540–1626), Marshal of France in 1614
 Antoine, Baron de Roquelaure (1560–1625), Marshal of France in 1614
 Louis de La Châtre, Baron de Maisonfort (died 1630), Marshal of France in 1616
 Pons de Lauzières-Thémines-Cardaillac, Marquis of Thémines (1553–1627), Marshal of France in 1616
 François de La Grange d'Arquien, Lord of Montigny and of Séry in Bérry (1554–1617), Marshal of France in 1616
 Nicolas de L'Hôpital, Duke of Vitry (1581–1644), Marshal of France in 1617
 Charles de Choiseul-Praslin, Marquis of Praslin (1563–1626), Marshal of France in 1619
 Jean François de La Guiche, Count of La Palice (1569–1632), Marshal of France in 1619
 Honoré d'Albert d'Ailly, Duke of Chaulnes (1581–1649), Marshal of France in 1620
 François d'Esparbes de Lussan, Viscount of Aubeterre (died 1628), Marshal of France in 1620
 Charles de Créquy, Prince of Poix, Duke of Lesdiguières (1580–1638), Marshal of France in 1621
 Jacques Nompar de Caumont, Duke of La Force(1558–1652), Marshal of France in 1621
 François, Marquis of Bassompierre (1579–1646), Marshal of France in 1622
 Gaspard de Coligny, Duke of Châtillon (1584–1646), Marshal of France in 1622
 Henri de Schomberg (1574–1632), Marshal of France in 1625
 Jean-Baptiste d'Ornano (1581–1626), Marshal of France in 1626
 François Annibal, Duc d'Estrées (1573–1670), Marshal of France in 1626
 Timoléon d'Epinay de Saint-Luc (1580–1644), Marshal of France in 1627
 Louis de Marillac, Count of Beaumont-le-Roger (1572–1632), Marshal of France in 1629
 Henri II, Duke of Montmorency and of Damville, also Admiral of France (1595–1632), Marshal of France in 1630
 Jean Caylar d'Anduze de Saint-Bonnet, Marquis of Toiras (1585–1636), Marshal of France in 1630
 Antoine Coëffier de Ruzé d'Effiat (1581–1632), Marshal of France in 1631
 Urbain de Maillé, Marquis of Brézé (1597–1650), Marshal of France in 1633
 Maximilien de Béthune, Duke of Sully (1560–1641), Marshal of France in 1634
 Charles de Schomberg, Duke of Halluin (1601–1656), Marshal of France in 1637
 Charles de La Porte, Marquis of Meilleraye (1602–1664), Marshal of France in 1639
 Antoine III, Duke of Gramont (1604–1678), Marshal of France in 1641
 Jean-Baptiste Budes, Count of Guébriant (1602–1643), Marshal of France in 1642
 Philippe de La Mothe-Houdancourt, Duke of Cardona (1605–1657), Marshal of France in 1642
 François de L'Hôpital, Count of Rosnay (1583–1660), Marshal of France in 1643
 Henri de la Tour d'Auvergne, Vicomte de Turenne (1611–1675), Marshal of France in 1643, Marshal General of France in 1660
 Jean, Count of Gassion, (1609–1647), Marshal of France in 1643

Louis XIV, 1643–1715

 César, Duke of Choiseul (1598–1675), Marshal of France in 1645
 Josias, Count of Rantzau (1609–1650), Marshal of France in 1645
 Nicolas de Neufville, Duke of Villeroi (1597–1685), Marshal of France in 1646
 Antoine d'Aumont de Rochebaron, Duc d'Aumont (1601–1669), Marshal of France in 1651
 Jacques d'Étampes, Marquis of la Ferté-Imbert (1590–1663), Marshal of France in 1651
 Henri, Duke of la Ferté-Senneterre (1600–1681), Marshal of France in 1651
 Charles de Mouchy, Marquis d'Hocquincourt (1599–1658), Marshal of France in 1651
 Jacques Rouxel, Count of Grancey (1603–1680), Marshal of France in 1651
 Armand Nompar de Caumont, Duke of La Force (1582–1672), Marshal of France in 1652
 Philippe de Clérambault, Count of la Palluau (1606–1665), Marshal of France in 1652
 César Phoebus d'Albret, Count of Miossens (1614–1676), Marshal of France in 1653
 Louis de Foucault de Saint-Germain Beaupré Count of Le Daugnon (1616–1659), Marshal of France in 1653
 Jean de Schulemberg, Count of Montejeu (1597–1671), Marshal of France in 1658
 Abraham de Fabert, Marquis of Esternay (1599–1662), Marshal of France in 1658
 Jacques de Mauvisière, Marquis of Castelnau (1620–1658), Marshal of France in 1658
 Bernardin Gigault, Marquis of Bellefonds (1630–1694), Marshal of France in 1668
 François de Créquy, Marquis of Marines (1620–1687), Marshal of France in 1668
 Louis de Crevant, Duke of Humières (1628–1694), Marshal of France in 1668
 Godefroy d'Estrades, Count of Estrades (1607–1686), Marshal of France in 1675
 Philippe de Montaut-Bénac, Duke of Navailles (1619–1684), Marshal of France in 1675
 Frédéric Armand, Duke of Schomberg (1616–1690), Marshal of France in 1675
 Jacques Henri de Durfort, Duke of Duras (1626–1704), Marshal of France in 1675
 François d'Aubusson, Duke of la Feuillade (1625–1691), Marshal of France in 1675
 Louis Victor de Rochechouart, Duke of Mortemart le Maréchal de Vivonne (1636–1688), Marshal of France in 1675
 François-Henri de Montmorency, duc de Luxembourg (1628–1695), Marshal of France in 1675
 Henri Louis d'Aloigny, Marquis of Rochefort (1636–1676), Marshal of France in 1675
 Guy de Durfort, Duke of Lorges (1630–1702), Marshal of France in 1676
 Jean II, Count of Estrées 1624–1707), Marshal of France in 1681
 Claude de Choiseul, Marquis of Francières (1632–1711), Marshal of France in 1693
 Jean Armand de Joyeuse, Marquis of Grandpré (1632–1710), Marshal of France in 1693
 François de Neufville, Duke of Villeroi (1644–1730), Marshal of France in 1693
 Louis François, duc de Boufflers, comte de Cagny (1644–1711), Marshal of France in 1693
 Anne-Hilarion de Costentin, Count of Tourville (1642–1701), Marshal of France in 1693
 Anne-Jules, 2nd duc de Noailles (1650–1708), Marshal of France in 1693
 Nicolas Catinat (1637–1712), Marshal of France in 1693
 Louis Joseph de Bourbon, duc de Vendôme (1654–1712), Marshal of France in 1695
 Claude Louis Hector, Duke of Villars (1653–1734), Marshal of France in 1702, Marshal General of France in 1733
 Noël Bouton, Marquis of Chamilly (1636–1715), Marshal of France in 1703
 Victor Marie, Duc d'Estrées (1660–1737), Marshal of France in 1703
 François Louis Rousselet, Marquis of Château-Renault (1637–1716), Marshal of France in 1703
 Sébastien Le Prestre, Marquis of Vauban (1633–1707), Marshal of France in 1703
 Conrad, Marquis of Rosen (1628–1715), Marshal of France in 1703
 Nicolas Chalon du Blé, Marquis of Huxelles (1652–1730), Marshal of France in 1703
 René de Froulay, Count of Tessé (1651–1725), Marshal of France in 1703
 Camille d'Hostun, duc de Tallard (1652–1728), Marshal of France in 1703
 Nicolas Auguste de La Baume, Marquis of Montrevel (1636–1716), Marshal of France in 1703
 Henry, duc d'Harcourt (1654–1718), Marshal of France in 1703
 Ferdinand, Count of Marsin (1656–1706), Marshal of France in 1703
 James FitzJames, 1st Duke of Berwick (1670–1734), Marshal of France in 1706
 Charles Auguste Goyon, Count of Matignon (1647–1729), Marshal of France in 1708
 Jacques de Bazin, Marquis of Bezons (1645–1733), Marshal of France in 1709
 Pierre de Montesquiou, Count of Artagnan (1645–1725), Marshal of France in 1709 N.B. : not the famous D'Artagnan, but a relative
 Alberico III Cybo-Malaspina, Duke of Massa (1674–1715), Marshal of France in 1703.

Louis XV, 1715–1774

 Victor-Maurice, comte de Broglie (1646–1727), Marshal of France in 1724
 Antoine Gaston Jean Baptiste, Duke of Roquelaure (1656–1738), Marshal of France in 1724
 Jacques Rouxel, Count of Grancey and of Médavy (1655–1725), Marshal of France in 1724
 Éléonor du Maine, Count of Le Bourg (1655–1739), Marshal of France in 1724
 Yves, marquis d'Alègre (1653–1733), Marshal of France in 1724
 Louis d'Aubusson, Duke of la Feuillade (1673–1725), Marshal of France in 1724
 Antoine V, Duke of Gramont (1671–1725), Marshal of France in 1724
 Alain Emmanuel, Marquis of Coëtlogon (1646–1730), Marshal of France in 1730
 Charles de Gontaut, Duke of Biron (1663–1756), Marshal of France in 1734
 Jacques de Chastenet, Marquis of Puységur (1665–1743), Marshal of France in 1734
 Claude Bidal, Marquis of Asfeld (1665–1743), Marshal of France in 1734
 Adrien-Maurice, 3rd duc de Noailles (1678–1766), Marshal of France in 1734
 Christian Louis de Montmorency-Luxembourg, Prince de Tingry (1713–1787), Marshal of France in 1734
 François Marie II, Duke of Broglie (1671–1745), Marshal of France in 1734
 François de Franquetot, Duke of Coigny (1670–1759), Marshal of France in 1734
 Charles, Duke of Lévis-Charlus (1669–1734), Marshal of France in 1734
 Louis de Brancas de Forcalquier, Marquis of Céreste (1671–1750), Marshal of France in 1740
 Louis Auguste d'Albert d'Ailly, Duke of Chaulnes (1676–1744), Marshal of France in 1741
 Louis Armand de Brichanteau, Duke of Nangis (1682–1742), Marshal of France in 1741
 Louis de Gand de Mérode de Montmorency, prince d'Isenghien (1678–1762), Marshal of France in 1741
 Jean-Baptiste de Durfort, Duke of Duras (1684–1778), Marshal of France in 1741
 Jean-Baptiste Desmarets, Marquis of Maillebois (1682–1762), Marshal of France in 1741
 Charles Fouquet, Duke of Belle-Isle, called the Marshal of Belle-Isle (1684–1762), Marshal of France in 1741
 Maurice, comte de Saxe (1696–1750), Marshal of France in 1741, Marshal General of France in 1747
 Jean-Baptiste Andrault, Marquis of Maulévrier (1677–1754), Marshal of France in 1745
 Claude Testu, Marquis of Balincourt (1680–1770), Marshal of France in 1746
 Philippe Charles, Marquis of la Fare (1687–1752), Marshal of France in 1746
 François, duc d'Harcourt (1689–1750), Marshal of France in 1746
 Guy, Count of Montmorency-Laval (1677–1751), Marshal of France in 1747
 Gaspard, Duke of Clermont-Tonnerre 1688–1781, Marshal of France in 1747
 Louis Claude, Marquis of La Mothe-Houdancourt (1687–1755), Marshal of France in 1747
 Ulrich, Count of Löwendahl (1700–1755), Marshal of France in 1747
 Louis François Armand du Plessis, duc de Richelieu (1696–1788), Marshal of France in 1748
 Jean de Fay, Marquis of la Tour-Maubourg (1684–1764), Marshal of France in 1757
 Louis Antoine de Gontaut (1701–1788), Count (afterwards Duke) of Biron, Marshal of France in 1757
 Daniel François de Gélas de Voisons d'Ambres, Viscount of Lautrec (1686–1762), Marshal of France in 1757
 Charles François Frédéric de Montmorency, Duke of Piney-Luxembourg (1702–1764), Marshal of France in 1757
 Louis Le Tellier, Duc d'Estrées (1695–1771), Marshal of France in 1757
 Jean Charles de la Ferté, Marquis of La Ferté Senneterre (1685–1770), Marshal of France in 1757
 Charles O'Brien de Thomond, Count of Thomond and of Clare (1699–1761), Marshal of France in 1757
 Gaston Pierre de Lévis, Duke of Mirepoix (1699–1758), Marshal of France in 1757
 Ladislas Ignace de Bercheny (1689–1778), Marshal of France in 1758
 Hubert de Brienne, Count of Conflans (1690–1777), Marshal of France in 1758
 Louis Georges, Marquis of Contades (1704–1793), Marshal of France in 1758
 Charles de Rohan, Prince of Soubise (1715–1787), Marshal of France in 1758
 Victor François, Duke de Broglie (1718–1804), Marshal of France in 1759
 Guy Michel de Durfort de Lorge, Duke of Randan (1704–1773), Marshal of France in 1768
 Louis de Brienne de Conflans, Marquis of Armentières (1711–1774), Marshal of France in 1768
 Jean de Cossé, Duke of Brissac (1698–1780), Marshal of France in 1768

Louis XVI, 1774–1792

 Anne Pierre, Duke of Harcourt (1701–1783), Marshal of France in 1775
 Louis, 4th duc de Noailles (1713–1793), Marshal of France in 1775
 Antoine, Count of Nicolaï (1712–1787), Marshal of France in 1775
 Charles, Duke of Fitz-James (1712–1787), Marshal of France in 1775
 Philippe, Duke of Mouchy (1715–1794), Marshal of France in 1775
 Emmanuel de Durfort, Duke of Duras (1715–1789), Marshal of France in 1775
 Louis Nicolas, Duc du Muy (1702–1775), Marshal of France in 1775
 Claude, Count of Saint-Germain (1707–1778), Marshal of France in 1775
 Guy de Montmorency, Duke of Laval (1723–1798), Marshal of France in 1783
 Augustin, Count of Mailly (1708–1794), Marshal of France in 1783
 Henri Bouchard de Lussan, Marquis of Aubeterre (1714–1788), Marshal of France in 1783
 Charles de Beauvau, Prince of Beauvau-Craon (1720–1793), Marshal of France in 1783
 Noël Jourda, Count of Vaux (1705–1788), Marshal of France in 1783
 Philippe Henri, marquis de Ségur (1724–1801), Marshal of France in 1783
 Jacques de Choiseul-Stainville, Count of Choiseul (1727–1789), Marshal of France in 1783
 Charles de La Croix, Marquis of Castries (1727–1801), Marshal of France in 1783
 Emmanuel de Croÿ-Solre, Duke of Croÿ (1718–1784), Marshal of France in 1783
 François Gaston de Lévis, Duc de Lévis (1719–1787), Marshal of France in 1783
 Nicolas Luckner, Comte Luckner (1722–1794), Marshal of France since in 1791
 Jean-Baptiste Donatien de Vimeur, comte de Rochambeau (1725–1807), Marshal of France in 1791

First Empire

Napoleon I, 1804–1814, 1815
Throughout his reign, Napoleon created a total of twenty-six Marshals of the Empire:

 Louis-Alexandre Berthier, Prince of Neuchâtel and of Wagram, Duke of Valangin  (1753–1815), Marshal of the Empire in 1804
 Joachim Murat, Prince d'Empire, Grand Duke of Berg, King of Naples (1767–1815), Marshal of the Empire in 1804
 Bon-Adrien Jeannot de Moncey, Duke of Conégliano (1754–1842), Marshal of the Empire in 1804
 Jean-Baptiste Jourdan, Count of the Empire (1762–1833), Marshal of the Empire in 1804
 André Masséna, Duke of Rivoli, Prince of Essling (1758–1817), Marshal of the Empire in 1804
 Pierre Augereau, Duke of Castiglione (1757–1816), Marshal of the Empire in 1804
 Jean-Baptiste Bernadotte (1763–1844), Prince of Pontecorvo, King of Sweden and Norway under the name Charles XIV John (1818–1844), Marshal of the Empire in 1804
 Guillaume Marie-Anne Brune, Count of the Empire (1763–1815), Marshal of the Empire in 1804
 Jean-de-Dieu Soult, Duke of Dalmatie (1769–1851), Marshal of the Empire in 1804, Marshal General of France in 1847
 Jean Lannes, Duke of Montebello (1769–1809), Marshal of the Empire in 1804
 Édouard Mortier, Duke of Trévise (1768–1835), Marshal of the Empire in 1804
 Michel Ney, Duke of Elchingen, Prince of the Moskva (1769–1815), Marshal of the Empire in 1804
 Louis-Nicolas Davout, Duke of Auerstädt, Prince of Eckmühl (1770–1823), Marshal of the Empire in 1804
 Jean-Baptiste Bessières, Duke of Istria (1768–1813), Marshal of the Empire in 1804
 François Christophe de Kellermann, Duke of Valmy (1737–1820), Marshal of the Empire in 1804 (honorary)
 François Joseph Lefebvre, Duke of Danzig (1755–1820), Marshal of the Empire in 1804 (honorary)
 Catherine-Dominique de Pérignon, Marquis of Grenade (1754–1818), Marshal of the Empire in 1804 (honorary)
 Jean-Mathieu-Philibert Sérurier, Count of the Empire (1742–1819), Marshal of the Empire in 1804 (honorary)
 Claude Victor-Perrin, Duc de Belluno (1764–1841), Marshal of the Empire in 1807
 Jacques MacDonald, Duke of Tarento (1765–1840), Marshal of the Empire in 1809
 Nicolas Oudinot, Duke of Reggio (1767–1847), Marshal of the Empire in 1809
 Auguste de Marmont, Duke of Ragusa (1774–1852), Marshal of the Empire in 1809
 Louis-Gabriel Suchet, Duke of Albufera (1770–1826), Marshal of the Empire in 1811
 Laurent de Gouvion Saint-Cyr, Marquis of Gouvion-Saint-Cyr (1764–1830), Marshal of the Empire in 1812
 Józef Poniatowski, Prince Poniatowski (1763–1813), Marshal of the Empire in 1813
 Emmanuel de Grouchy, marquis de Grouchy (1766–1847), Marshal of the Empire in 1815

The names of nineteen of these have been given to successive stretches of boulevards encircling Paris, which has thus been nicknamed the Boulevards des Maréchaux (Boulevards of the Marshals). Another three Marshals have been honored with a street elsewhere in the city. The four Marshals banned from memory are: Bernadotte and Marmont, considered as traitors; Pérignon, stricken off the list by Napoleon in 1815; and Grouchy, regarded as responsible for the defeat at Waterloo.

Restoration

Louis XVIII, 1815–1824

 Georges Cadoudal (1771–1804), Marshal of France in 1814 (posthumous)
 Jean Victor Marie Moreau (1763–1813), Marshal of France in 1814 (posthumous)
 François-Henri de Franquetot de Coigny, Duke of Coigny (1737–1821), Marshal of France in 1816
 Henri Jacques Guillaume Clarke, Duke of Feltre (1765–1818), Marshal of France in 1816
 Pierre Riel de Beurnonville, Marquis of Beurnonville (1752–1821), Marshal of France in 1816
 Charles Joseph Hyacinthe du Houx de Viomesnil, Marquis of Viomesnil (1734–1827), Marshal of France in 1816
 Jacques Alexandre Law, Marquis of Lauriston (1768–1828), Marshal of France in 1823
 Gabriel Jean Joseph Molitor, Count Molitor (1770–1849), Marshal of France in 1823

Charles X, 1824–1830
 Louis Aloy de Hohenlohe-Waldenburg-Bartenstein, Prince of Hohnlohe-Waldenburg-Bartenstein (1765–1829), Marshal of France in 1827
 Nicolas Joseph Maison, Marquis Maison (1771–1840), Marshal of France in 1829
 Louis Auguste Victor de Ghaisne de Bourmont, Count of Bourmont (1773–1846), Marshal of France in 1830

July Monarchy

Louis-Philippe 1830–1848

 Étienne Maurice Gérard, Count Gérard (1773–1852), Marshal of France in 1830
 Bertrand Clauzel, Count Clauzel (1772–1842), Marshal of France in 1831
 Emmanuel de Grouchy, Marquis of Grouchy (1766–1847), Marshal of France in 1831
 Georges Mouton, Count Lobau (1770–1838), Marshal of France in 1831
 Sylvain Charles Valée, Count Valée (1773–1846), Marshal of France in 1837
 Horace Sébastiani, Count Sébastiani (1772–1851), Marshal of France in 1840
 Jean-Baptiste Drouet, Count d'Erlon (1765–1844), Marshal of France in 1843
 Thomas Robert Bugeaud, Duke of Isly, (1784–1849), Marshal of France in 1843
 Honoré Charles Reille, Count Reille (1775–1860), Marshal of France in 1847
 Guillaume Dode de la Brunerie, Viscount de la Brunerie (1775–1851), Marshal of France in 1847

Second Republic

Louis-Napoleon Bonaparte, 1848–1852

 Jérôme Bonaparte, former King of Westphalia (1784–1860), Marshal of France in 1850
 Rémi Joseph Isidore Exelmans, Count Exelmans (1775–1852), Marshal of France in 1851
 Jean Isidore Harispe, Count Harispe (1768–1855), Marshal of France in 1851
 Jean-Baptiste Philibert Vaillant, Count Vaillant (1790–1872), Marshal of France in 1851
 Jacques Leroy de Saint-Arnaud (1798–1854), Marshal of France in 1852
 Bernard Pierre Magnan (1791–1865), Marshal of France in 1852
 Boniface de Castellane, Marquis of Castellane (1788–1862), Marshal of France in 1852

Second Empire

Napoleon III, 1852–1870

 Achille Baraguey d'Hilliers, Count Baraguey d'Hilliers (1795–1878), Marshal of France in 1854
 Aimable Pélissier, Duke of Malakoff (1794–1864), Marshal of France in 1855
 Jacques Louis Randon, Count Randon (1795–1871), Marshal of France in 1856
 François Certain de Canrobert (1809–1895), Marshal of France in 1856
 Pierre Bosquet (1810–1861), Marshal of France in 1856
 Patrice de MacMahon, Duke of Magenta (1809–1893), Marshal of France in 1859
 Auguste Regnaud de Saint-Jean d'Angély (1794–1870), Marshal of France in 1859
 Adolphe Niel (1802–1869), Marshal of France in 1859
 Philippe Antoine d'Ornano, Count of Ornano (1784–1863), Marshal of France in 1861
 Élie Frédéric Forey (1804–1872), Marshal of France in 1863
 François Achille Bazaine (1811–1888), Marshal of France in 1864
 Edmond Le Bœuf (1809–1888), Marshal of France in 1870

Third Republic

Raymond Poincaré, 1913–1920
 Joseph Joffre (1852–1931), Marshal of France in 1916
 Ferdinand Foch (1851–1929), Marshal of France in 1918
 Philippe Pétain (1856–1951), Marshal of France in 1918

Alexandre Millerand, 1920–1924
 Joseph Gallieni (1849–1916), Marshal of France in 1921 (posthumous)
 Hubert Lyautey (1854–1934), Marshal of France in 1921
 Louis Franchet d'Espèrey (1856–1942), Marshal of France in 1921
 Marie Émile Fayolle (1852–1928), Marshal of France in 1921
 Michel-Joseph Maunoury (1847–1923), Marshal of France in 1923 (posthumous)

Fourth Republic

Vincent Auriol, 1947–1954
 Jean de Lattre de Tassigny (1889–1952), Marshal of France in 1952 (posthumous)
 Philippe Leclerc de Hauteclocque (1902–1947), Marshal of France in 1952 (posthumous)
 Alphonse Juin (1888–1967), Marshal of France in 1952

Fifth Republic

François Mitterrand, 1981–1995
 Marie-Pierre Kœnig (1898–1970), Marshal of France in 1984 (posthumous)

Refused
This distinction was refused by :

 Eugène Cavaignac (1802–1857), head of the Government of the Second Republic, in 1848
 Louis-Jules Trochu (1815–1896), head of the Government of National Defense, in 1871
 Charles de Gaulle (1890–1970), president of the Provisional Government of the French Republic, in 1946

See also 
Admiral of France
Grand Constable of France
Marshal of the Empire
Marshal General of France

Notes

References 

 
France
Lists of French military personnel
Military ranks of France